Horon is a traditional  folk dance from Pontus or Eastern Black Sea Region in Turkey.

Name

Etymology
The term horon derives from Greek choros, which means "dance." The earliest instance of its usage in a Turkic language is in Codex Cumanicus from 1303.

Variants
In Ordu and Giresun, the term horan is used instead of horon.

See also
Khigga
Dabke
Tamzara

References

Greek dances
Turkish folk dances
Circle dances
Pontic Greek dances